The Mangere Refugee Resettlement Centre (MRRC) is the central processing and assessment location for all refugees who arrive in New Zealand. It is a housing complex, set on a  site in Auckland owned by the New Zealand Government where all United Nations Quota Refugees enter for a 6-week period of assessment and orientation prior to resettlement.  The MRRC is the national refugee resettlement operation for New Zealand and is a 'one-stop-shop' with a collaborative service run by several key agencies. including Immigration New Zealand, Refugees As Survivors New Zealand (RASNZ), Auckland Public Health Refugee Medical Services, Refugee Services Aotearoa New Zealand Inc., Auckland University of Technology, and the Red Cross.

See also
Immigration New Zealand
Department of Labour (New Zealand)

References

External links
Immigration New Zealand

Refugees in New Zealand
Immigration to New Zealand